The 33rd Golden Bell Awards was held on 26 March 1998 at the Sun Yat-sen Memorial Hall, Taipei, Taiwan. The ceremony was broadcast by CTS.

Winners and nominees
The Golden Bell Awards ceremony was held at the Sun Yat-sen Memorial Hall on March 26, 1998 (19:00), and was broadcast by CTS on the same day at 21:00.

Below is the list of winners and nominees for the main categories.

References

1998
1998 in Taiwan